Gerrhopilus ater, also known as the black blind snake,  is a species of snake in the Gerrhopilidae family.

References

ater
Reptiles described in 1839